Guntra is a Latvian feminine given name. The associated name day is September 20.

Notable people named Guntra
Guntra Kuzmina, Latvian singer

References 

Latvian feminine given names
Feminine given names